The People's Assembly was the top level legislative body of the People's Republic of Mozambique.

The assembly was formally created during the FRELIMO Party's 3rd Congress in 1977, when the Front reformed into a formal political party. Being the Vanguard Party, FRELIMO had a constitutionally mandated majority in the People's Assembly, with elections to the Local, District, Provincial and People's Assembly being organised through FRELIMO members and FRELIMO candidates.

The People's Assembly was renamed and reorganised into the Assembly of the Republic in the 1990 constitution, however the new Assembly was functionally the same until multi-party elections in 1994 and the establishment of the Parliamentary system in Mozambique.

See also
History of Mozambique
Legislatures in communist states
List of national legislatures

References

Politics of Mozambique
Political organisations based in Mozambique
Government of Mozambique
Mozambique
Mozambique
1977 establishments in Mozambique